Mangelia olivieriana is a species of sea snail, a marine gastropod mollusk in the family Mangeliidae.

Description
The length of the shell can reach 9 mm, its diameter 3 mm.

This is a thin species that is sparse in its distribution. It has a milky-white or bluish colour, with an olive-brown fugitive epidermis. It is 8-whorled, three being only very slightly ridged, and crossed with coarsish distant raised lines. The aperture is wide. The outer lip is thin. The sinus is wide but very shallow. The columella is straight.

Distribution
This marine species can be found off Baluchistan facing the coast of Oman.

References

External links
  Tucker, J.K. 2004 Catalog of recent and fossil turrids (Mollusca: Gastropoda). Zootaxa 682:1-1295.
 

olivieriana
Gastropods described in 1917